Scape may refer to:

Biology 
 The basal, "stalk" part of a projecting insect organ, such as first (basal) segment of an antenna or the oviscape of the ovipositor
 A finger-like appendage of the epigyne of a female spider
 Scape (botany), part of a flowering stem

Cooking 
 Garlic scapes, the edible, immature flowering stems of the garlic plant

Gaming 
 Planescape, a campaign setting for the Dungeons & Dragons fantasy role-playing game
 RuneScape, a massively multiplayer online role-playing game

Television 
 Farscape, an Australian science fiction television series

See also
 Escape (disambiguation)
 Landscape, the visible features of an area of land
 Cityscape, the urban equivalent of a landscape
 Scapegoating, singling out one person for unmerited negative treatment or blame
 Soundscape, a part of an acoustic environment